Allen Leech (born 18 May 1981) is an Irish actor best known for his role as Tom Branson on the historical drama series Downton Abbey and as Paul Prenter in the 2018 biopic Bohemian Rhapsody. He made his professional acting debut with a small part in a 1998 production of A Streetcar Named Desire, made his first major film appearance as Vincent Cusack in Cowboys & Angels, and earned an Irish Film & Television Awards nomination in 2004 with his performance as Mo Chara in Man About Dog.  Leech played Marcus Agrippa on the HBO historical drama series Rome.

Early life
Leech was born in Killiney, County Dublin, to David Leech, the CEO of a computer systems company, and Kay Leech. He is the third of four children; he has an older brother, Greg, an older sister, Alli, and a younger brother, Simon. He attended St Michael's College. Leech became interested in acting at 11 when he was given the part of the Cowardly Lion in a school production of The Wizard of Oz and found he loved being on stage. He recalled how he immediately decided to become an actor when Peter McDonald told him how acting is a profession on the last night of the production's run.

Afterwards, drama became the "focal point" of Leech's teenage years, apart from his family life, and drama and family support helped him through his school years. He became set on acting after winning a small role in a 1998 production of A Streetcar Named Desire at the Gate Theatre. He earned a Bachelor of Arts and a Master's Degree in Drama and Theatre Studies from Trinity College Dublin, later noting this was a "loophole" in his parents' stipulation that he earn a degree to fall back on if he failed to have success as an actor. He landed his first major roles in Cowboys & Angels and Man About Dog while at Trinity, and he has admitted that he did little schoolwork because he spent his time on auditions and acting.

Career

Leech's first professional stage role was in 1998 at the Gate in their production of A Streetcar Named Desire. "I was the gentleman caller to Frances McDormand's Blanche Dubois. The Coen brothers were walking backstage, and me a naive 16-year-old."

He appeared as Willi in the Queen and Peacock, at the Garter Lane Arts Centre. The following years, Leech was in Tom Murphy's The Morning After Optimism and then Hugh Leonard's Da at the Abbey.

Leech's breakthrough film performance was in Cowboys and Angels, in which he played Vincent, a gay fashion student, followed by a role in the 2004 cross-country caper film Man About Dog.

Leech played the role of Shane Kirwan in the Ireland's RTÉ series Love Is the Drug, in which he received a Best Actor nomination from the Irish Film and Television Awards. He followed that up with the role of Willy in the television series Legend, which is the story of three different Irish families. He received a Best Supporting Actor nomination from Irish Film and Television Awards for his performance.

In 2007, Leech appeared in the HBO drama series Rome as Marcus Agrippa, Octavian's top soldier and friend. The film, Rewind, opened in Ireland on 25 March 2011.

In 2010, he appeared on the small screen in The Tudors as the doomed Francis Dereham, former lover of Catherine Howard. Leech also appeared in ITV 2010s television series Downton Abbey as chauffeur Tom Branson, whose twin beliefs in socialism and Irish Republicanism clash with those of the British upper class. He played the role of officer Sam Leonard in television series Primeval in 2011 in series five. Leech also starred in the 2012 film adaptation The Sweeney. In 2014 he starred alongside Benedict Cumberbatch, as the spy John Cairncross, in The Imitation Game.

Leech was voted sexiest Irish male in 2005 in U Magazine. He was named one of GQ's 50 best dressed men in Britain in 2015.

In 2017, Leech appeared alongside Ginnifer Goodwin in the Los Angeles stage production of Constellations. The play ran from June 14 to July 23, 2017, at the Geffen Playhouse.

Leech played Paul Prenter, who was briefly Freddie Mercury's manager and male lover, in the biopic Bohemian Rhapsody (2018), which earned him a nomination for Outstanding Performance by a Cast in a Motion Picture at the 25th Screen Actors Guild Awards.

Leech reprised his role as Tom Branson in the feature films Downton Abbey (2019) and Downton Abbey: A New Era (2022). He has an upcoming role in the crime drama The Vanishing Triangle opposite India Mullen.

Personal life
In February 2018, Leech announced his engagement to actress Jessica Blair Herman. They were married in an outdoor ceremony on 5 January 2019 at the Alisal Ranch and Resort in Solvang, California. Guests at the ceremony included Leech's Downton Abbey costars Michelle Dockery and Dan Stevens, as well as his Bohemian Rhapsody costars Rami Malek, Gwilym Lee, and Lucy Boynton. In September 2019, the couple announced that they were expecting their first child.

Filmography

Film

Television

Video games

Stage

Appearances

Awards and nominations

References

External links

RTÉ Legend Official Site

1981 births
Living people
Irish male film actors
Irish male stage actors
Irish male television actors
Irish male video game actors
Irish male voice actors
People from Killiney
Alumni of Trinity College Dublin
20th-century Irish male actors
21st-century Irish male actors
People educated at St Michael's College, Dublin
Outstanding Performance by an Ensemble in a Drama Series Screen Actors Guild Award winners